Takatomi Nobunaga ( Nobunaga Takatomi) is a Japanese composer, principally of choral music. In 1994 he graduated from the Department of Education in the Faculty of Literature at Sophia University. He taught himself composition. His choral music is currently frequently performed in Japan.

Major works

Instrumental
 From Nowhere for flute, marimba and vibraphone
 Wind Vane for flute, cello and piano
 String Quartet
 Prelude for piano

Choral
 Nostalgia for mixed/female/male chorus a cappella (arrangement)
 Songs for a Fresh Heart for mixed/female/male chorus and piano
 Seven Children's Songs for female chorus/equal voices without accompaniment (arrangement)
 Voice for a cappella male chorus
 Cowboy Pop for mixed/male voices a cappella
 Faraway for mixed voices a cappella
 Kan kan kakurembo - Nursery Rhyme of Wakayama for children's or female choir
 Hab' ein Lied auf den Lippen for male voices and piano
 A Tree for female chorus without accompaniment
 Two songs of Corsica Island for female chorus without accompaniment (arrangement)

References and external links
 Takatomi Nobunaga's major works (ja)

Choral composers
Japanese classical composers
Japanese male classical composers
Living people
Year of birth missing (living people)